Elephant shrews, also called jumping shrews or sengis, are small insectivorous mammals native to Africa, belonging to the family Macroscelididae, in the order Macroscelidea. Their traditional common English name "elephant shrew" comes from a perceived resemblance between their long noses and the trunk of an elephant, and their superficial similarity with shrews (family Soricidae) in the order Eulipotyphla. However, phylogenetic analysis has revealed that elephant shrews are not properly classified with true shrews, but are in fact more closely related to elephants than to shrews. In 1997, the biologist Jonathan Kingdon proposed that they instead be called "sengis" (singular sengi), a term derived from the Bantu languages of Africa, and in 1998, they were classified into the new clade Afrotheria.

They are widely distributed across the southern part of Africa, and although common nowhere, can be found in almost any type of habitat, from the Namib Desert to boulder-strewn outcrops in South Africa to thick forest. One species, the North African elephant shrew, remains in the semi-arid, mountainous country in the far northwest of Africa. The Somali elephant shrew went unobserved from 1968 to 2020 but was rediscovered by a group of scientists in Djibouti.

Characteristics
Compared to other mammalian insectivores, sengis have relatively large brains.

Elephant shrews are small, quadrupedal, insectivorous mammals resembling rodents or opossums, with scaly tails, long snouts, and legs quite long for their size, which are used to move from one place to another like rabbits. The new Rhynchocyon is only known from two populations that cover about 300 km2 of montane forest. Although the size of the trunk varies among species, all are able to twist it about in search of food. Their lifespans are about two and a half to four years in the wild. They have large canine teeth, and also high-crowned cheek teeth similar to those of ungulates. Their dental formula is G

Although mostly diurnal and very active, they are difficult to trap and very seldom seen; elephant shrews are wary, well camouflaged, and adept at dashing away from threats. Several species make a series of cleared pathways through the undergrowth and spend their day patrolling them for insect life. If the animal is disturbed, the pathway provides an obstacle-free escape route.

Elephant shrews are not highly social animals, but many live in monogamous pairs, which share and defend their home territory, marked using scent glands. Rhynchocyon species also dig small conical holes in the soil, bandicoot-style, but others may make use of natural crevices, or make leaf nests.

Short-eared elephant shrews inhabit the dry steppes and stone deserts of southwestern Africa. They can even be found in the Namib Desert, one of the driest regions of the earth. Females drive away other females, while males try to ward off other males. Although they live in pairs, the partners do not care much for each other and their sole purpose of even associating with the opposite sex is for reproduction. Social behaviors are not very common and they even have separate nests. The one or two young are well developed at birth; they are able to run within a few hours.

Female elephant shrews undergo a menstrual cycle similar to that of human females and the species is one of the few nonprimate mammals to do so. Elephant shrews were used in the 1940s to study the human menstruation cycle. The elephant shrew mating period lasts for several days. After mating, the pair will return to their solitary habits. After a gestation period varying from 45 to 60 days, the female will bear litters of one to three young several times a year. The young are born relatively well developed, but remain in the nest for several days before venturing outside.

After five days, the young's milk diet is supplemented with mashed insects, which are collected and transported in the cheek pouches of the female. The young then slowly start to explore their environment and hunt for insects. After about 15 days, the young will begin the migratory phase of their lives, which lessens their dependency on their mother. The young will then establish their own home ranges (about ) and will become sexually active within 41–46 days.

The thermal characteristics of elephant shrews with similar body size, habitat and distribution are very close in most of the classifications.  They can maintain homeothermy in different ambient temperatures where most of the species regulate their body temperature at 35°C and neither become hyperthermic but they balance the heat offload by increasing the EWL (evaporative water loss).

Feeding habits
Elephant shrews mainly eat insects, spiders, centipedes, millipedes, and earthworms. An elephant shrew uses its nose to find prey and uses its tongue to flick small food into its mouth, much like an anteater. Eating large prey can pose a challenge; an elephant shrew struggling with an earthworm must first pin its prey to the ground with a forefoot. Then, turning its head to one side, it chews pieces off with its cheek teeth, much like a dog chewing a bone. This is a sloppy process, and many small pieces of worm drop to the ground; these are simply flicked up with the tongue. Some elephant shrews also feed on small amounts of plant matter, especially new leaves, seeds, and small fruits.

Evolution
A number of fossil species are known, all from Africa. They were separate from the similar-appearing order Leptictida. A considerable diversification of macroscelids occurred in the Paleogene period. Some, such as Myohyrax, were so similar to hyraxes that they were initially included with that group, while others, such as Mylomygale, were relatively rodent-like. These unusual forms all died out by the Pleistocene. Although macroscelids were classified in the past with many groups, often on the basis of superficial characteristics, considerable morphological and molecular evidence places them within Afrotheria, at the base of Afroinsectivora.

In terms of timing, the divergence between macroscelids and afrosoricidans is thought to have occurred roughly 57.5 million years (Ma) ago, in the late Paleocene, while the diversification of extant macroscelids apparently began when the Rhynchocyon lineage split off about 33 Ma ago, in the early Oligocene. Elephantulus is considered to have separated from Macroscelidini later in the Oligocene, about 28.5 Ma ago.

Phylogeny

Classification

The 20 species of elephant shrew are placed in six genera, three of which are monotypic:
 ORDER MACROSCELIDEA
Family Macroscelididae
 Genus Elephantulus
Short-snouted elephant shrew, E. brachyrhynchus
 Cape elephant shrew, E. edwardii
 Dusky-footed elephant shrew, E. fuscipes
 Dusky elephant shrew, E. fuscus
 Bushveld elephant shrew, E. intufi
 Eastern rock elephant shrew, E. myurus
 Karoo rock elephant shrew, E. pilicaudus
Western rock elephant shrew, E. rupestris
 Genus Galegeeska
 Somali elephant shrew, G. revoilii
Rufous elephant shrew, G. rufescens
 Genus Macroscelides
 Namib round-eared sengi, M. flavicaudatus
 Etendeka round-eared sengi, M. micus
 Round-eared elephant shrew, M. proboscideus
 Genus Petrodromus
 Four-toed elephant shrew, P. tetradactylus
 Genus Petrosaltator
 North African elephant shrew, P. rozeti
 Genus Rhynchocyon
 Golden-rumped elephant shrew, R. chrysopygus
 Checkered elephant shrew, R. cirnei
 Black and rufous elephant shrew, R. petersi
 Stuhlmann's elephant shrew, R. stuhlmanni
 Grey-faced sengi, R. udzungwensis

References

External links
 

 
 

 
Mammals of Africa
Extant Lutetian first appearances
Taxa named by Charles Lucien Bonaparte